Bulletrain is a Swedish heavy metal band formed in the suburbs of Helsingborg in 2006 by drummer Jonas Tillheden and guitarist Mattias Persson, together with singer Robert Lindell, bassist Tim Svalo and later guitarist Robin Bengtsson. The band is influenced by bands like Mötley Crüe, Guns N' Roses, Skid Row and Pantera.

History 
In 2007 the band released their first EP Johnny GoneBad, produced by Klas Ideberg from Helsingborgs band Darkane. It was well received and led to the band getting gigs locally as the opening act for bands such as: Crashdïet, Bullet and Crazy Lixx. In the fall of 2009 the band released in their second EP Turn It Up! again produced by Klas Ideberg.

In the autumn of 2009, however, the band had its first setback when bassist Tim Svalo quit. He was replaced by Emil Lundberg. The first real milestone for the band came in the spring of 2010 when they were involved in the "Rest In Sleaze" festival, dedicated to the former lead singer  from Crashdïet: Dave Lepard, who had died. That show resulted in a minor tour of Italy and also in an offer from musician/producer Chris Laney(Crashdïet, Crazy Lixx) to record a single for the band. On July 16, 2010 they recorded the songs Even With My Eyes Closed and Take Me To The Sun in Polar Studios in Stockholm. Bass was played by Therions bassist Nalle Pahlsson because  bassist Emil Lundberg had decided to leave the band the day before the recording in Stockholm.

The single Even With My Eyes Close gained the attention of Georg Siegl of Metal Heaven, but then the singer Robert Lindell quit the band and everything fell apart.

A couple of tough years awaited the band.  Mike Palace from Stockholm took over as vocalist. However, it didn't last because of the distance. Bassist Tim Svalo also returned to the band during this period, but parted way with Bulletrain after Mike Palace left the band.

But the remaining members of the band Jonas, Mattias and Robin refused to give up, and decided to begin recording their debut album on their own. The summer of 2013 the band found the Växjö native Sebastian Sundberg and the bassist Niklas Mansson. The winter of that year Bulletrain returned to Stockholm. Now for a collaboration with the duo RamPac (Johan Ramstrom and Patrik Magnusson) who had produced Crashdïets album Generation Wild where the vocals on the upcoming debut was recorded. The results exceeded the bands expectations and after Buster Odeholm from the band "Humanity's Last Breath" mixed the material, debut was a fact.

In the summer of 2014 also resolved in that Georg Siegl gave the band a second chance and offered to release their debut album Start Talking on his label Metal Heaven.

The winter of 2015 Bulletrain once again teamed up with the producers of RamPac (Johan Ramstrom and Patrik Magnusson) and went to Riga, Latvia to record their follow up album What you fear the most. The album is mixed by Tobias Lindell (Hardcore Superstar, Europe and H.E.A.T). And the world famous mastering engineer Vlado Meller (SlipKnot, Metallica, Michael Jackson, Pink Floyd) made the finishing touch.

Band members
Current members

Jonas Tillheden - Drums (2006–present)
Mattias Persson - Lead Guitar (2006–present)
Robin Bengsston - Rhythm Guitar (2006/2007–present)
Sebestian Sundberg - Lead Vocals (2013–present)
Niklas Mansson - Bass Guitar (2013–present)

Former members

Robert Lindell - Lead Vocals (2006-2011)
Tim Svalo - Bass Guitar (2006-2009, 2011-2012)
Emil Lundberg - Bass Guitar (2009-2010)
Mike Palace - Lead Vocals (2011-2012)

Discography 
Recordings

Albums

References 

 Spirit-of-metal.com Retrieved October 30, 2014
 SleazeRoxx.com Retrieved October 28, 2014
 ReverbNation.com Retrieved October 30, 2014
 Metal-Temple.com Retrieved October 29, 2014
 Heavyparadise.blogspot.se Retrieved September 25, 2016

External links 
 
 Facebook
 Twitter
 Metal Heaven

Musical groups established in 2006
Swedish glam metal musical groups
Swedish hard rock musical groups
Swedish heavy metal musical groups